Kakambal ni Eliana (International title: Eliana's Twin / ) is a 2013 Philippine television drama fantasy series broadcast by GMA Network. Directed by Roderick Lindayag, it stars Kim Rodriguez. It premiered on April 15, 2013 on the network's Afternoon Prime line up replacing Forever. The series concluded on August 23, 2013 with a total of 93 episodes. It was replaced by Pyra: Babaeng Apoy in its timeslot.

Premise
The story revolves around the life of Eliana, a girl who was born with a black snake attached to her back. The reptile wraps itself around her hand every time she experience extreme emotions like sadness or anger. She spends her life hidden in a basement, until she manages to get away. In the process, she strives to find out the truth about herself and her family.

She will eventually discover new things and meet people that will eventually change her life. In the outside world, she meets new friends and two of them, Gabo and Julian fall in love with her. Gabo is a street-smart lad who accepts Eliana for who she is, while Julian is a fashion photographer who is bewildered by Eliana's beauty, not knowing that she has a snake twin. However, she also meets her rival, Margarita, who is Julian's model-girlfriend and unknown to everyone, her half sister.

Cast and characters
Lead cast
 Kim Rodriguez as Isabella  Eliana Cascavel-Dominguez

Supporting cast
 Jean Garcia as Isabel "Bel" Cascavel-Dominguez (formerly Monteverde)
 Kristofer Martin as Gabriel "Gabo" Santillan
 Jomari Yllana as Emmanuel "Eman" Dominguez
 Chynna Ortaleza as Minerva San Beda
 Enzo Pineda as Julian de Vera
 Lexi Fernandez as Margarita "Marga" Dominguez
 Leo Martinez as Eddie Cascavel
 Eva Darren as Aurora Cascavel
 Sherwin Revister as the voice of Naja

Recurring cast
 Antonio Aquitania as Sebastian "Basti" Monteverde
 Sherilyn Reyes-Tan as Nora Dominguez
 Carlene Aguilar as Angie De Vera
 Jay-R as Nathan De Vera
 Ernie Garcia as Samuel Dominguez
 Carmen Soriano as Henrietta Monteverde
 Mosang as Tetay
 Rez Cortez as Prof. Banal
 Aicelle Santos as Kate Banal
 Sue Prado as Cora
 Anette Samin as Claire Cascavel
 Marnie Lapuz as Mrs. San Jose

Production and development
Screenwriter, Des Garbes Severino conceptualized and developed the series in mid-2011, initially titled as "Serpentina". The idea for the series is inspired from the urban myth—that has been around since the 80's—about the daughter of a mall owner who has a snake twin and dwells in a secret room/basement of the mall. The title later change to Kakambal ni Eliana.

February 11, 2013 the four main characters underwent "snake workshop" with two Mexican black kingsnakes. The drill required them to get
familiarized with all the snake species.

Ratings
According to AGB Nielsen Philippines' Mega Manila household television ratings, the pilot episode of Kakambal ni Eliana earned a 12.2% rating. While the final episode scored a 17.3% rating.

Accolades

References

External links
 

2013 Philippine television series debuts
2013 Philippine television series endings
Fantaserye and telefantasya
Filipino-language television shows
GMA Network drama series
Television shows set in the Philippines